The Beach Rotana is a grand resort in Abu Dhabi, United Arab Emirates.

The hotel is one of the oldest hotels in Abu Dhabi. It a member of The Leading Hotels of the World and part of Rotana Hotels. It is a hotel complex made up of two wings in Abu Dhabi's tourist club area, Al Zahiyah. The Beach Wing which stands with seven floors includes 286 rooms and suites whilst the Tower wing is 20 floors high and includes 128 rooms and suites. The Beach wing was opened in 1993 and the Tower wing in 2002. The hotel was established as the Beach Hotel by Nasser Al Nowais and Selim El Zyr, with backing by the hotel owner, Sheikh Suroor bin Mohammed.

The hotel houses twelve restaurants and bars, Zen the spa at Rotana and the Beach Club with a 120-metre beach, two swimming pools, and a gymnasium.

The Beach Rotana is next to Abu Dhabi Mall and is directly linked by an internal entrance. Opposite on Al Maryah Island is the Cleveland Clinic Abu Dhabi hospital building, dominating the view.

Information

Companies involved in construction
 Hotel Tower, Apartments and Beach Club:
Consult Limited / Arabian Construction Company / Ghazi Awad/MAPCO
 Beach Wing:
Arabian Construction Company / Al Zubair

References

External links
 Hotel website
 

1993 establishments in the United Arab Emirates
Hotel buildings completed in 1990
Hotels in Abu Dhabi
Rotana Hotel Management Corporation PJSC